Carl-Johan Bernhardt (1946-2016), was a male international table tennis player from Sweden.

He won two bronze medals at the 1963 World Table Tennis Championships and 1967 World Table Tennis Championships in the Swaythling Cup (men's team event).

The 1963 team consisted of Hans Alsér, Stellan Bengtsson and Kjell Johansson and the 1967 team consisted of Alsér, Christer Johansson, Kjell Johansson and Bo Persson.

He was a five times gold medal winner in the team event at the European Table Tennis Championships and played 90 times for the Swedish national team.

See also
 List of table tennis players
 List of World Table Tennis Championships medalists

References

Swedish male table tennis players
1946 births
2016 deaths
World Table Tennis Championships medalists